Coffadeliah Creek is a stream in the U.S. state of Mississippi. It is a tributary to Owl Creek.

Coffadeliah is a name derived from the Choctaw language meaning "sassafras grove".

References

 

Rivers of Mississippi
Rivers of Neshoba County, Mississippi
Mississippi placenames of Native American origin